Malcolm Brodie may refer to:

 Malcolm Brodie (politician) (born 1949), mayor of Richmond, British Columbia
 Malcolm Brodie (journalist) (1926–2013), Scottish-born journalist from Northern Ireland